Timothy Hampton is an American historian of French studies and history, currently the Aldo Scaglione and Marie M. Burns Distinguished Professor of French and Comparative Literature at the University of California, Berkeley. He is the author of Bob Dylan's Poetics: How the Songs Work.

References

Year of birth missing (living people)
Living people
21st-century American historians
21st-century American male writers
University of California, Berkeley College of Letters and Science faculty
Historians from California
American male non-fiction writers